The 2005 Asian Weightlifting Championships were held in Dubai in United Arab Emirates between September 23 and October 1, 2005. It was the 37th men's and 18th women's championship. The event was organised by the Asian Weightlifting Federation.

Medal summary

Men

Women

Medal table 

Ranking by Big (Total result) medals 

Ranking by all medals: Big (Total result) and Small (Snatch and Clean & Jerk)

Participating nations 
110 athletes from 18 nations competed.

 (2)
 (5)
 (14)
 (6)
 (7)
 (5)
 (8)
 (7)
 (14)
 (3)
 (5)
 (3)
 (3)
 (2)
 (15)
 (1)
 (4)
 (6)

References
Men's Results
Women's Results

Asian Weightlifting Championships
Asian Weightlifting Championships
Weightlifting Championships
Asian Weightlifting Championships
Weightlifting in the United Arab Emirates